Bajaj Nomarks is an Indian beauty brand of skin-care products, established and headquartered in Mumbai, India. Founded in 2001, the product range includes  anti-marks creams, face washes, scrubs, sunscreen, soaps, and face packs for the consumer and professional markets. The brand was initially launched as Nomarks by Ozone Ayurvedics, which was later acquired by Bajaj Corp in 2013 to enter the skin care industry. As of 2017, the brand is available in more than 37 countries includes SAARC, Gulf & Middle-East, ASEAN and African regions. It is sold in over 2 lakhs outlets in India.

As a result of its celebrity endorsements and infomercials, Bajaj Nomarks is one of the most popular and recognizable product series in the anti marks face cream space. The company advertises that their product starts working on marks from day one. Taapsee Pannu is the brand ambassador of the brand.

References

External links
 Bajaj Nomarks
 Bajaj Corp
 Ozone Ayurvedics

Indian brands
Cosmetics companies of India
Bajaj Group